Star Dojran is a village in the southeastern part of North Macedonia. It is the seat of the municipality of Dojran. Star Dojran means "Old Dojran" in Macedonian.

Demographics
As of the 2021 census, Star Dojran had 413 residents with the following ethnic composition:
Macedonians 288
Turks 56
Persons for whom data are taken from administrative sources 30
Serbs 18
Roma 11
Albanians 4
Vlachs 3
Others 3

According to the 2002 census, the settlement had a total of 363 inhabitants. Ethnic groups in the village include:
Macedonians 255
Turks 57
Serbs 32
Romani 9
Albanians 6
Aromanians 1
Others 3

References

Villages in Dojran Municipality